Yury Mikhaylovich Ilyasov (30 November 1926 – 26 December 2005) was a Soviet high jumper. He competed at the 1952 Summer Olympics and shared 13th place.

References

1926 births
2005 deaths
Soviet male high jumpers
Athletes (track and field) at the 1952 Summer Olympics
Olympic athletes of the Soviet Union